August Friedrich Karl Marahrens (11 October 1875, in Hanover – 3 May 1950, in Loccum, Lower Saxony) was a German Protestant bishop who served as Landesbischof of the Evangelical-Lutheran Church of Hanover

Bibliography
 Paul Fleisch: Landesbischof D. Marahrens. In: Lutherische Kirche, Heft 20, 1935, 353–356.
 Friedrich Duensing (ed.): Der Landesbischof und die Kirche. 1935.
 Friedrich Duensing: Der Abschied Seiner Hochwürden des Landesbischofs D. Marahrens aus dem Bischofamte. 1947.

Clergy from Hanover
1875 births
1950 deaths
20th-century German Lutheran bishops